Yamashiro Park Taiyogaoka Stadium is an athletic stadium in Uji, Kyoto, Japan.

External links
Kyoto Prefectural Yamashiro Sports Park 

Football venues in Japan
Sports venues in Kyoto Prefecture
Uji, Kyoto
Sports venues completed in 1982
1982 establishments in Japan